Claude Guéant (born 17 January 1945) is a French civil servant. The former chief of staff to Nicolas Sarkozy, he served as Minister of the Interior from 27 February 2011 until 15 May 2012. He is a member of the conservative Union for a Popular Movement (UMP).

Life and career
Claude Guéant was born in Vimy. He studied law in Paris at a university. He then entered Sciences Po and then the ENA administration school (Thomas More promotion of 1971). After graduating from the ENA, he became chief of staff of the prefect of the Finistère department, and then, in 1974, general secretary of Guadeloupe for economic affairs. In 1977, he entered the Ministry of Interior as a technical counsellor of Christian Bonnet, an office which he held until François Mitterrand's election in 1981.

Nominated sub-prefect (sous-préfet hors-classe), he then worked alongside the prefect of the region Centre. Guéant then became general secretary of the prefecture of the Hérault department and then of the Hauts-de-Seine. In 1991, he was nominated prefect of the Hautes-Alpes department.

During the second cohabitation (Édouard Balladur's government), he was named deputy-director of Charles Pasqua's cabinet, who was at the time the Minister of Interior. In 1994, he was named general director of the national police.

Under Jacques Chirac's presidency, he was named in 1998 prefect of the Franche-Comté region and of the Doubs department, before being named prefect of the Brittany region and of the Ille-et-Vilaine department in 2000.

He has been closely associated with Nicolas Sarkozy since at least 2002. From 2002 he was Sarkozy's chief of staff (directeur de cabinet), following him to the Ministry of Finance in 2004, then to the Ministry of the Interior from June 2005 to March 2007. During the 2007 presidential campaign, he was in charge of Sarkozy's campaign. and was named general secretary of the Elysée on 16 May 2007. He is particularly listened to by Sarkozy, and his power has given him many surnames such as the "Cardinal", "Prime Minister bis", or "Vice President".

On 27 February 2011, he was nominated Secretary of the Interior (Ministère de l'Intérieur). Though Alain Juppé has explicitly denied it, many have claimed that Guéant's departure from the post of general secretary was a sine qua non for Juppé to accept the Minister of Foreign Affairs position the same day, due to Guéant's meddling in foreign policy since his appointment in 2007.

In 2015, Guéant was given a two-year suspended prison sentence, barred from public office for five years, and fined €75,000 for taking €210,000 over two years from a cash fund intended for police investigations and using it to award bonuses to himself and his staff. In 2019 a French court rejected his appeal, sentencing him to one year in prison.

Guéant has been the target of two investigative judge cases, including one where Sarkozy's 2007 campaign allegedly received donations from the government of Libya, under the reign of Col. Muammar el-Qaddafi.

In October 2021, the Judicial Tribunal of Nanterre announced that Claude Guéant will be tried for "illicit financing" of his legislative campaign of 2012, because of the distribution of a leaflet in his favor by the mayor LR of Boulogne-Billancourt (Hauts-de -Seine). On 21 January 2022, Guéant and three co-defendants, writer and one-time Sarkozy advisor Patrick Buisson, former cabinet director Emmanuelle Mignon and former pollster and consultant Pierre Giacometti, were found guilty of polling fraud involving allegations that they misused public money while ordering public opinion polls worth a combined 7.5 million euros ($8.7 million) during the course of Sarkozy's presidency between 2007 and 2012 and was sentenced to eight months in jail. He would be released on parole on 9 February after it was determined that he repaid the French treasury 292,000 euros in damages.

Personal life 
Guéant is a fan of American literature, and spent time in Minnesota in his younger days.

References

External links
 Notice biographique of the Who's Who in France (restricted access)

1945 births
Living people
People from Vimy
Union for a Popular Movement politicians
The Strong Right
French interior ministers
Prefects of France
Prefects of Doubs
Prefects of Ille-et-Vilaine
French civil servants
Sciences Po alumni
École nationale d'administration alumni
Chevaliers of the Légion d'honneur
French politicians convicted of crimes
Recipients of the Order of Prince Yaroslav the Wise, 2nd class